Bursalı Mehmed Tahir Bey (1861–1925) was a Turkish writer, researcher and soldier especially well known for his biography and bibliography containing "Ottoman authors", a source book encyclopedia which still continues to be regarded as a basic reference.

Biography  
Born in Bursa in 1861, Mehmet Tahir Bey joined the Ottoman Army to complete his national service. He furthermore was a member of the Ottoman Parliament between 1908–1912. Mehmet Tahir Bey died in 1925 in Istanbul.

1861 births
1925 deaths
19th-century writers from the Ottoman Empire
20th-century writers from the Ottoman Empire